EC1 Science and Technology Centre - science centre located in the former Heat Power Station at 1/3 Targowa Street in Łódź, Poland. Primarily Łódź Power Station was a first city power station producing electricity for citizens. Operational since 1907, expanded in 1929, worked till 2000 and regarded as a historical monument due to its architectural values. Revitalised since 2010 and adapted for cultural and educational purposes.

The exhibition was opened on 7 January 2018 and it is a part of the EC1 Łódź - City of Culture complex. The institution is co-run by the City of Łódź and the Ministry of Culture and National Heritage.

The name EC1 is an acronym referring to the later, but also to the historical name of the facility, i.e. the Heat and Power Station No. 1 in Łódź.

The science centre is addressed to a wide audience to popularising science, technology and allow visitors to perform experiments including: acoustics, electromagnetism, magnetism, fluid mechanics, optics, thermal conductivity, radioactivity.

Exhibition 
The exhibition area is over 18 000 m2 and the total cost of equipment was PLN 45.5 million (about €10.4M), of which nearly PLN 18.4 million (about €4.2M) is co-financed by the European Regional Development Fund

The permanent exhibition consists of three thematic paths: "Conversion of energy", "Development of knowledge and civilization" and "Microworld - Macroworld". The exposition includes an auditorium, 3D spherical cinema and laboratory spaces divided according to the theme of the pathes

Energy conversion path - The historical and technical path, focuses on the original character of the site at the different periods and presents of the energy conversion based on a conventional coal-fired thermal power station.
The historical part of the path includes: stories of former employees, archival materials, history of the place from the beginning to the present, historical context of Lodz, importance for the Lodz city and national energy industry.
 
The technical part of the path focuses on the usage, transportation and importance of: coal, water/steam, air (oxygen), and the use and importance of the various components of a power station / cogeneration station in the production of heat and power.

In addition, the potential of using other fossil fuels is mentioned and a model for a nuclear power plant is presented in the subject of conventional energy. In the alternative energy topic, models of a geothermal power plant, a pumped storage power plant, a photovoltaic system, and a wind turbine blade are presented and discussed.

Development of knowledge and civilization - The interactive path presents some of experiments, discoveries and inventions that were the milestones in the development of mankind incl. simple machines, electromagnetic radiation.

Microworld - Macroworld - An insightful path that depicts the world at full scale from micro-objects to the largest objects in the universe.

References

Exhibitions
Museums in Łódź
Science communication
Education in Łódź
Energy in Poland
Alternative education
Science museums in Poland
Science centers
Museums established in 2018